Hazel Dell, also spelled Hazeldell, is an unincorporated community located in Comanche County, in the U.S. state of Texas.

History
The area in what is known as Hazel Dell today was first settled around 1869. A sawmill was established there on Mill Branch, a tributary of the Leon River. It cut most of the rawhide lumber that was used for buildings in the community. Besides the sawmill, it also had a store, a hotel, a bowling alley, and a saloon. More businesses were eventually built as the community continued to grow. A post office was established at Hazel Dell in 1871 but was listed as Resley's Creek in 1870. A nondenominational Christian church named Flat Rock Church served the community but is no longer in operation. The first graves in the cemetery were added in 1873. The community served local ranches during the 1870s, but also brought in cowboys and drifters. Crime also ran rampant in the community, in which it had a history of murders, hangings, cattle rustling, gaming, and mob activities. Hazel Dell became the second-largest city in Comanche County in 1880. It subsequently began to decline when the railroad bypassed the community. Its population was 30 in 1884, 45 in 1890, and 100 in 1896. It had a cotton gin and flour mill that same year. There was a cemetery and several scattered houses in the community in 1940. These, along with the community center, remained in the community in the 1990s and the community continued to be listed on county maps.

Geography

Education
The first school in Hazel Dell was built in 1873, although the first mention of a school came three years later. It remained in operation in 1940 until it joined the Gustine Independent School District later that decade. The community continues to be served by the Gustine ISD to this day.

References

Unincorporated communities in Comanche County, Texas
Unincorporated communities in Texas